"Garryowen", also known as "Garyowen", "Garry Owen" and "Gary Owens", is an Irish tune for a jig dance.  It was selected as a marching tune for Australian, British, Canadian, and American military formations, including General George Armstrong Custer's 7th Cavalry Regiment and Australia's 2 Cav Regiment.

History 
The word garryowen is derived from Irish, the proper name Eóin and the word for garden garrai – thus "Eóin's Garden". A church dating to the 12th century by the Knights Templar, dedicated to St. John the Baptist, is the source of the modern area of Garryowen in the city of Limerick, Ireland. Owen's Garden, overlooking the River Shannon was a fashionable retreat and recreational area for the citizens of Limerick.

The song emerged during the late 18th century, when it was a drinking song of rich young roisterers in Limerick. An alternate title is "Let Bacchus' sons be not dismayed".

Sung to the tune "Auld Bessie", it obtained immediate popularity in the British Army through the 5th (or Royal Irish) Regiment of Dragoons.

It was published with additional lyrics in Thomas Moore's 1808 "Irish Melodies". Beethoven composed two arrangements of the song during 1809–1810 (published 1814–1816 in W.o.O. 152 and W.o.O. 154) with the title, "From Garyone My Happy Home", with lyrics by T. Toms, on romantic themes.  The arrangements were part of a large project by George Thomson to engage prominent composers of his time to write arrangements of the folk songs of Ireland, Scotland, and Wales. The composer Mauro Giuliani arranged the tune in Arie Nazionali Irlandesi nr.1-6 Op.125 (Six Irish Airs). The Bohemian composer Ignaz Moscheles (1794 – 1870) included the tune in his op. 89 Souvenirs de l'Irlande, "Recollections of Ireland", for solo piano and orchestra.

British military units
A very early reference to the tune appears in the publication The Life of the Duke of Wellington by Jocquim Hayward Stocqueler, published during 1853. He describes the defence of the town of Tarifa during the Peninsular War, late December 1811. General H. Gough, later Field Marshal Hugh Gough, 1st Viscount Gough, commanding officer of the 87th Regiment (Later the Royal Irish Fusiliers), under attack by French Grenadiers, drew his sword, tossed his scabbard, and called on his men to stand with him until the enemy should walk over their bodies. The troops responded with the "Garryowen".

It was used as a march by the 88th Regiment of Foot (Connaught Rangers) during the Peninsular War.

Garryowen was also a favourite during the Crimean War. The tune has also been associated with a number of British military units, and is the authorised regimental march of The Irish Regiment of Canada. It was the regimental march of the Liverpool Irish, British Army. It is the regimental march of the London Irish Rifles.  It was also the regimental march of the 50th (Queen's Own) Foot until 1869.

Garry Owen most recently was also the Regimental Quick March of The Ulster Defence Regiment CGC (UDR). When the UDR merged with The Royal Irish Rangers during 1992 to become The Royal Irish Regiment, Garry Owen was replaced by Killaloe.

US military units
During early 1851 Irish citizens of New York City formed a militia regiment known locally as the Second Regiment of Irish Volunteers.  The group selected "Garryowen" as their official regimental marching song.  On 12 October 1851, the Regiment was accepted officially as part of the New York Militia and designated as 69th Infantry Regiment, New York Militia, (the famed "Fighting 69th" ). It is presently known officially as the 1st Battalion, 69th Infantry and is part of the 42nd Infantry Division. The song is heard several times throughout the Warner Bros. movie The Fighting 69th (1940), starring James Cagney, Pat O'Brien, and Alan Hale, Sr., which chronicles the World War I exploits of the U.S. 69th Infantry Regiment, New York National Guard.

7th Cavalry
It later became the marching tune for the American 7th Cavalry Regiment during the late 19th century. The tune was brought to the 7th Cavalry by Brevet Colonel Myles W. Keogh and other officers with relations to the Fifth Royal Irish Lancers and the Papal Guard. As the story goes, it was the last song played for Custer's men as they left General Terry's column at the Powder River. The 7th Cavalry became a part of the 1st Cavalry Division during 1921. The word "Garryowen" was used often during the Vietnam War by soldiers of First Cavalry as a password to identify each other. It became the official tune of the division during 1981. The name of the tune has become a part of the regiment, the words Garry Owen are part of the regimental crest.

The tune became the name for bases established by the Cavalry in current conflicts. The most recent was Contingency Operating Station, (COS), Garryowen in the Maysan Province of Iraq. FOB Garryowen was established in support of Operation Iraqi Freedom 8–10 in June 2008 by 2nd Battalion, 7th Cavalry Regiment. There is a Camp Garry Owen, north of Seoul, Korea, which houses part of the 4th Squadron of the First Cavalry regiment.

Theodore Roosevelt considered it "the greatest fighting tune in the world."

References

Sources
 GlobalSecurity.org (2004) 4th Squadron 7th Cavalry Regiment Retrieved
 Lewis Winstock, Songs & Music of the Redcoats, 1642–1902, (1970)
 Walter Wood, The Romance of Regimental Marches, (1932)
 5th (Royal Irish) Lancers connection to the early history of Garryowen: Royal Irish Lancers
 1st Squadron 7th Cavalry (history, song, etc.): US Army site 
 1st Cavalry Division (history): US Army site
 General Information: (2004.03.17) The "American Soldier" blog, no name or expertise cited, but the information is well written, complete and meshes with other sources. Retrieved 2004.12.10.

External links

Beethoven's arrangements for piano trio:

British military marches
Irish dance
Irish songs
London Regiment (1908–1938)
Ulster Defence Regiment
American military marches
Canadian military marches
Australian military marches
18th-century compositions